Stefan Polónyi (6 July 1930 – 9 April 2021) was a Hungarian-born German civil engineer.

Biography
Polónyi studied civil engineering at the Budapest University of Technology and Economics. He left Budapest for Cologne in 1956 and opened his office the following year, called Stefan Polónyi & Partner. In 1965, he became a professor of engineering at the Technical University of Berlin before he held the same position at the Technical University of Dortmund starting in 1971. There, he invented the "Dortmund model" of joint training for engineers and architects.

Stefan Polónyi died in Cologne on 9 April 2021 at the age of 90.

Works
 in Frechen (1971)
Technoseum in Mannheim (1982–1990)
Galeria auf dem Messegelände in Frankfurt (1980–1983)
Kunstmuseum Bonn in Bonn (1985–1993)
Bahnsteigüberdachung des Kölner Hauptbahnhofs in Cologne (1990)
Car & Driver Autohaus in Hamburg (1990–1991)
Leipzig Trade Fair (1991–1995)
 in Berlin (1992–1996)
Messehalle 2 in Hanover (1992–1996)
 in Dortmund (1993–1994)
Bundespräsidialamt in Berlin (1994–1998)
Krickesteg im ERIN-Park Castrop-Rauxel (1994)
Klosterkapelle Frenswegen (1996)
Doppelbogenbrücke im Nordsternpark von Gelsenkirchen (1996)
Gitternetzbrücke im Nordsternpark von Gelsenkirchen (1997)
Stege West im Nordsternpark von Gelsenkirchen (1997)
TZU-Fußgängerbrücke in Oberhausen (1997)
Wohn- und Geschäftshaus Eigelstein 115 in Cologne (1997)
Tiergartenbrücke in Dessau-Roßlau (2000)
Straßenbrücke Ripshorster Straße in Oberhausen (2008)

Publications
Schalen in Beton und Kunststoff: Entwurf, Bemessung, Ausführung (1970)
Einige Gedanken zum wissenschaftlichen Stand der Baustatik (1981)
Der Tragwerksingenieur und seine Wissenschaft (1982)
Mit zaghafter Konsequenz: Aufsätze und Vorträge zum Tragwerksentwurf 1961–1987 (1987)
Über Tektonik in der Baukunst (1993)
Die neue Stahlbetonkonzeption (1996)
Beton Atlas – Entwerfen mit Stahlbeton im Hochbau (2001)
Architektur und Tragwerk (2003)

References

1930 births
2021 deaths
German civil engineers
Hungarian emigrants to Germany
Budapest University of Technology and Economics alumni
Academic staff of the Technical University of Berlin
Academic staff of the Technical University of Dortmund
People from Gyula